William Arthur Hurd (born 29 June 1999) is a rugby union player for Leicester Tigers in Premiership Rugby, his preferred position is prop.  Born in Ashby, Leicestershire, Hurd qualifies for Scotland through his maternal grandmother and represented Scotland under 20s during the 2019 World Rugby Under 20 Championship.

Hurd began playing rugby at Ashby RFC, and was selected in a Midlands under 18s side in 2016, before attending Cardiff Metropolitan University.  Hurd was selected for Scotland's under 20s in 2019, before being selected for the BUCS Super Rugby team of the year in 2020.

On 17 February 2021 Hurd signed for his home town side Leicester Tigers. He made his debut as a replacement in Leicester's European Rugby Challenge Cup Round of 16 win against Connacht on 3 April 2021.

References

1999 births
Living people
Alumni of Cardiff Metropolitan University
Alumni of Loughborough College
English rugby union players
Leicester Tigers players
Rugby union players from Ashby-de-la-Zouch
Rugby union props